Greg Fryer is an Australian former rugby league footballer who played in the 1960s and 1970s.  He played for Balmain in the New South Wales Rugby League (NSWRL) competition.

Background
Fryer grew up in Balmain and played his junior rugby league for Rozelle Codocks.  Fryer was then graded by Balmain and won the reserve grade premiership with the club in 1967.

Playing career
Fryer made his first grade debut for Balmain in 1968 and only made one appearance that season.  Fryer won the third grade premiership with Balmain in the same year.  In 1969, Fryer made 11 appearances as the club won their 11th and final premiership defeating South Sydney in one of the big grand final upsets.  Fryer was selected to play in the grand final as a replacement for Peter Provan but was taken out of the side at the last moment as Provan was declared fit to play.

Fryer played with Balmain up until the end of 1974 and then signed on to be captain-coach with Oberon winning the premiership in his first season there.  Fryer then captain-coached Macquarie United for 3 seasons in the Newcastle competition and finally went on to captain-coach Ballina.

Post playing
Fryer worked at the Ballina Seagulls Leagues Club for 30 years as Director and Secretary/Manager of the club.  In 2008 he was named Coach of the Ballina Seagulls Team of the Century.

References

1949 births
2015 deaths
Australian rugby league players
Balmain Tigers players
Ballina Seagulls captains
Ballina Seagulls players
Rugby league players from Sydney
Rugby league second-rows
Rugby league props
Rugby league locks